Middleware for games is a piece of software that is integrated into a game engine to handle some specialized aspect of it, such as physics, graphics or networking.

Notable

 Autodesk Gameware - from Autodesk, includes Scaleform GFx, Kynapse, Beast and HumanIK
 Nvidia GameWorks - visual FX, physics, particle and fluid simulations
Simplygon - automated 3D content optimization for a variety of assets as vegetation, buildings, scene views...
 SpeedTree - vegetation programming and modelling software products
 xaitment - customizable and modular game AI software for navigation mesh generation, pathfinding, character behavioral modeling and more

AI: Pathfinding, collisions 
 AiLive - a suite of game AI middleware
 Kythera AI - Complete AI Toolset Middleware
 Mercuna - 3D navigation middleware

Full-Motion Video 
 Bink Video - video file format, video compression tools and playback library from RAD Game Tools.
 CRI-Sofdec - created by CRI Middleware. It is highly used in Dreamcast games.

Online Multiplayer 
 DemonWare - created by Activision.
 Steamworks - used for Valve Corporation's Steam.

Physics & Animation 
 Cocos2D - 2D physics engine.
 Euphoria - 3D human animation engine created by NaturalMotion based on Dynamic Motion Synthesis.
 FaceFX - realistic facial animation engine created by OC3 Entertainment.
 Havok - 3D physics engine.

Real-Time Rendering 
 trueSKY - real-time sky & weather renderer created by Simul Software.

Sound 
 CRI-ADX - created by CRI Middleware. It is highly used in Dreamcast games.
 FMOD
 Miles Sound System - audio authoring tools and engine developed by RAD Game Tools.
 Wwise - audio engine and authoring tools from Audiokinetic.

See also 

 Game engine
 Middleware
 Video game development

M